A dog coat is a dog's fur or hair.

Dog coat may also refer to:

Rug (animal covering), jacket or blanket for a dog
Fur clothing, made from the fur of a dog,

See also
Chiengora